Strong Island may refer to:
Long Island
Strong Island (film)
 Strong Island in Pleasant Bay, Cape Cod, Massachusetts
 Strong Island (Michigan), near Lake Erie